Chippewa Valley High School is a public, magnet high school located in Clinton Township, Michigan, United States. It serves grades 9–12 for the Chippewa Valley Schools.

Demographics
The demographic breakdown of the 2,431 students enrolled for 2017-18 was:
Male - 50.0%
Female - 50.0%
Native American/Alaskan - 0.1%
Asian - 2.1%
Black - 17.1%
Hispanic - 5.7%
Native Hawaiian/Pacific islanders - 0.1%
White - 69.6%
Multiracial - 5.3%

36.0% of the students were eligible for free or reduced-cost lunch.

Athletics
Chippewa Valley's Big Reds compete in the Macomb Area Conference, and the school colors are red and white. The following Michigan High School Athletic Association (MHSAA) sanctioned sports are offered:

Baseball (boys)
Basketball (girls and boys) 
Bowling (girls and boys) 
Competitive cheerleading (girls)
Cross country (girls and boys) 
Football (boys) 
State champion - 2001, 2018
Golf (girls and boys) 
Ice hockey (boys)
Lacrosse (girls and boys) 
Soccer (girls and boys) 
Softball (girls) 
Swim and dive (girls and boys) 
Tennis (girls and boys) 
Track and field (girls and boys) 
Volleyball (girls) 
Wrestling (boys)

Notable alumni

 Paul Feig  creator of the Freaks and Geeks TV series.
 Sean Murphy-Bunting  NFL player of the Tampa Bay Buccaneers
 David Hahn  the "Radioactive Boy Scout"
 Carey Torrice  Michigan politician
 Kelly Gunther  speed skater, member of US Olympic Team
 Evan Jankens  Radio Producer, 97.1 The Ticket Detroit
 Jeff Zatkoff  Ice Hockey

References

External links

Chippewa Valley Schools

Schools in Macomb County, Michigan
Public high schools in Michigan
1961 establishments in Michigan